Savitri Girls’ College, established in 1972, is an undergraduate women's college in Kolkata, West Bengal, India. It offers courses in arts and commerce. It is affiliated with the University of Calcutta.

Departments

Arts and Commerce
Bengali
English
Hindi
History
Political Science
Philosophy
Economics
Education
Human Development
Commerce

Accreditation
Savitri Girls’ College is recognized by the University Grants Commission (UGC).
In 2014, the college underwent its second cycle of NAAC reaccreditation and scored a B.

See also 
List of colleges affiliated to the University of Calcutta
Education in India
Education in West Bengal

References

External links
Savitri Girls’ College

Educational institutions established in 1972
University of Calcutta affiliates
Universities and colleges in Kolkata
Women's universities and colleges in West Bengal
1972 establishments in West Bengal